The Philipson-Stow Baronetcy, of Cape Town in the Colony of Cape of Good Hope, and Blackdown House in Lodsworth in the County of Sussex, is a title in the Baronetage of the United Kingdom. It was created on 26 July 1907 for the diamond magnate Frederic Philipson-Stow. Born Frederic Stow, he had assumed by Royal licence the additional surname of Philipson in 1891.

Philipson-Stow baronets, of Cape Town and Blackdown House (1907)
Sir Frederic Samuel Philipson-Stow, 1st Baronet (1849–1908)
Sir Elliot Philipson Philipson-Stow, 2nd Baronet (1876–1954)
Sir Frederic Lawrence Philipson-Stow, 3rd Baronet (1905–1976)
Sir Edmond Cecil Philipson-Stow, MBE, 4th Baronet (1912–1982)
Sir Christopher Philipson-Stow, DFC, 5th Baronet (1920–2005)
Sir (Robert) Matthew Philipson-Stow, 6th Baronet (born 1953)

Notes

References
Kidd, Charles, Williamson, David (editors). Debrett's Peerage and Baronetage (1990 edition). New York: St Martin's Press, 1990, 

Philipson-Stow
People from Lodsworth